Lazaros Iakovou (born August 5, 1976 in Larnaca, Cyprus) is a retired Cypriot defender who played for Nea Salamina. He started his career in AEK Larnaca. He also played abroad and especially in Greece for Panachaiki F.C. and Apollon Kalamarias FC.

International career
Iakovou made his international debut with Cyprus National Team on 13 February 2002, in the final of Cyprus International Tournament 2002 against Czech Republic at GSP Stadium, playing the whole 90 minutes in Cyprus' 3-4 defeat.

References

External links
 

1976 births
Living people
Cypriot footballers
Cyprus international footballers
Association football defenders
AEK Larnaca FC players
Panachaiki F.C. players
Apollon Limassol FC players
Apollon Pontou FC players
Nea Salamis Famagusta FC players
Omonia Aradippou players
Digenis Akritas Morphou FC players
Cypriot First Division players
Super League Greece players
Cypriot expatriate footballers
Expatriate footballers in Greece